The Blue Knight  is a  1973 television miniseries and theatrical film adapted from Joseph Wambaugh's 1973 novel The Blue Knight. It inspired the 1975 TV series also titled The Blue Knight. The miniseries was broadcast on NBC TV in November 1973, consisted of four one-hour episodes (including commercials), was directed by Robert Butler, and featured an all star cast headed by William Holden as Police Officer Bumper Morgan. The additional cast includes Lee Remick, Anne Archer, Sam Elliott, Joe Santos, and Vic Tayback. It was later released as a film in condensed form.

Premise
Bumper Morgan is a 20-year veteran of the Los Angeles Police Department who is scheduled to retire in a week. Before he leaves, he must work on the murder of a prostitute in one of LA's far corners. Along the way, he must grapple with vicious thugs, his fellow officers who have mixed feelings about his retirement, and his woman who wants him to leave the streets.

Cast
 William Holden as Bumper Morgan
 Lee Remick as Cassie Walters
 Anne Archer as Laila
 Sam Elliott as Detective Charlie Bronski
 Joe Santos as Sergeant Cruz Segovia
 Vic Tayback as Neil Grogan
 Lucille Benson as Elmira Gooch
 Ja'net DuBois as Celia Louise
 Mario Roccuzzo as Harold Wagner
 Jamie Farr as Yasser Hafiz

Production
Holden said he was surprised to be cast as Morgan, as he thought Ernest Borgnine or Rod Steiger would have been preferred.  Shooting took seven weeks.  The Blue Knight was filmed as a four-episode miniseries of 60 minutes each for the US market and a 100-minute theatrical film for European markets.  It was one of the first miniseries on American television.

Reception
The film was broadcast on four consecutive evenings, beginning on November 11, 1973, and received positive reviews.  Jay Sharbutt of the Associated Press praised the miniseries' realism and wrote that readers "ought to catch this show".  Rick Du Brow of United Press International wrote that the miniseries' length allows it to unfold slowly and create a "cohesive dramatic atmosphere", unlike typical TV films.  Time Out London, in a retrospective review of the theatrical cut, called it "seminal stuff" and wrote that it is more interesting for its influence on following police dramas than its story.

Awards

Emmys went to William Holden (in his first TV film role), director Robert Butler, and editors Marjorie and Gene Fowler Jr.  Lee Remick received an Emmy nomination.  The show was also nominated for Outstanding Limited Series.

References

External links 
 

1973 television films
1973 films
1973 crime drama films
1970s American films
1970s English-language films
1970s police films
American crime drama films
American drama television films
American police detective films
Crime television films
Films about the Los Angeles Police Department
Films based on American crime novels
Films directed by Robert Butler
Films scored by Nelson Riddle
Films set in Los Angeles
NBC network original films
Television films based on books